Saint Luke's North Hospital-Barry Road Campus is an 84-bed hospital located at 5830 Northwest Barry Road in Kansas City, Missouri. The hospital first opened in 1989.

Services
The hospital offers a 24-hour emergency department that utilizes heart and stroke procedures created by Saint Luke's Mid America Heart Institute and Saint Luke's Marion Bloch Neuroscience Institute. The hospital also offers diagnostic testing facilities, a maternity unit with a level II neonatal intensive care unit (NICU), rehabilitation services, and outpatient provider offices.

References

External links
 Saint Luke's North Hospital-Barry Road Official Website

Hospital buildings completed in 1989
Buildings and structures in Kansas City, Missouri
Hospitals in Kansas City, Missouri
1989 establishments in Missouri